Ranka may refer to:

 Ranka (ethnic group), an ethnic group belonging to the Marwari people of Rajasthan, India
 Ranka (grape), another name for the wine grape Chasselas
 Luglienga, another wine and table grape that is also known as Ranka
  Ranka (legend), an Indian legend, also known as Tushar Ranka
 The strategy game of Go
 Ranka Lee, a character in the Japanese anime Macross Frontier
 Lingdum Monastery (also Ranka Monastery) at Ranka, in Sikkim, India
 Ranka Velimirović, film producer
  Ranka Kagurazaka, a character in Valkyrie Drive- Bhikkhuni
 Arpit Ranka, Indian actor
 H S Ranka, Indian industrialist
 Ranka Ōkami, a character from the Japanese anime and manga Seton Academy: Join the Pack!